Frits Beukers (born 1953, Ankara) is a Dutch mathematician, who works on number theory and hypergeometric functions.

In 1979 Beukers received his PhD at Leiden University under the direction of Robert Tijdeman with thesis The generalized Ramanujan–Nagell Equation, published in Acta Arithmetica, vol. 38, 1980/1981. From 1979 to 1980 he was a visiting scholar at the Institute for Advanced Study. He became a professor in Leiden and in the 2000s at Utrecht University.

Beukers works on questions of transcendence and irrationality in number theory, and on other topics.   In connection with the famous proof by Roger Apéry (1978) on the irrationality of the values of the Riemann zeta function evaluated at the points 2 and 3, Beukers gave a much simpler alternate proof using Legendre polynomials. He also published on questions in mechanics about dynamical systems and their exact solvability.

Selected works
 
 
 A rational approach to Pi, Nieuw Archief voor Wiskunde, 2000, Heft 4

References

External links
 Homepage in Utrecht
 

1953 births
Living people
20th-century Dutch mathematicians
21st-century Dutch mathematicians
Leiden University alumni
Academic staff of Leiden University
Academic staff of Utrecht University
Institute for Advanced Study visiting scholars
People from Ankara